Éric Sikora (born 4 February 1968) is a French former footballer who played as a defender. He spent his whole career at RC Lens.

Club career
Whilst at Lens Sikora contributed 33 appearances as his side won 1997–98 French Division 1. The following season he played in the final as they won the 1998-99 Coupe de la Ligue.

International career
Sikora was born in France and is of Polish descent. Sikora was a youth international for the France U21s.

Personal life
Sikora is the nephew of the French international footballer, François Ludo, who also played for RC Lens.

See also
List of one-club men

References

External links

 
 Stats
 Profile

1968 births
Living people
People from Courrières
Sportspeople from Pas-de-Calais
French footballers
France under-21 international footballers
Association football defenders
RC Lens players
Ligue 1 players
Ligue 2 players
French football managers
RC Lens managers
French people of Polish descent
RC Lens non-playing staff
Footballers from Hauts-de-France
20th-century French people
21st-century French people